Henry Aldrich (15 January 1648 – 14 December 1710) was an English theologian, philosopher, and composer.

Life
Aldrich was educated at Westminster School under Dr Richard Busby. In 1662, he entered Christ Church, Oxford, and in 1689 was made Dean in succession to the Roman Catholic John Massey, who had fled to the Continent. In 1692, he became Vice-Chancellor of the University of Oxford until 1695. In 1702, he was appointed Rector of Wem in Shropshire, but continued to reside at Oxford, where he died on 14 December 1710. He was buried in Christ Church Cathedral without any memorial, at his own request.

Works

Henry Aldrich was a man of unusually varied gifts. A classical scholar of fair merits, he is best known as the author of a little book on logic (Artis Logicæ Compendium). Although not innovative in the field of Logic itself (it closely follows Peter of Spain's Summulae Logicales), its insistent use by generations of Oxford students has shown it to be of great synthetic and didactic value: the Compendium continued to be read at Oxford (in Mansel's revised edition) till long past the middle of the 19th century.

Aldrich also composed a number of anthems and church services of high merit, and adapted much of the music of Palestrina and Carissimi to English words with great skill and judgment. To him we owe the well-known catch, "Hark, the bonny Christ Church bells."

Evidence of his skill as an architect may be seen in the church and campanile of All Saints Church, Oxford, and in three sides of the so-called Peckwater Quadrangle of Christ Church, which were erected after his designs. He bore a great reputation for conviviality', and wrote a humorous Latin version of the popular ballad A soldier and a sailor, A tinker and a tailor, etc.

Another specimen of his wit is furnished by the following epigram of the five reasons for drinking:

If on my theme I rightly think,
There are five reasons why men drink:—
Good wine; a friend; because I'm dry;
Or lest I should be by and by;
Or — any other reason why.

This epigram is a translation of the following Latin dictum attributed by the Menagiana to Jacques Sirmond:

Si bene quid memini, causae sunt quinque bibendi;
Hospitis adventus, praesens sitis atque futura,
Aut vini bonitas, aut quaelibet altera causa.
Aldrich had a large personal library of ca. 3000 books, 8000 pieces of music, and 2000 engravings which he bequeathed to Christ Church upon his death. His engravings constitute one of the earliest surviving English collections in this field.

References

Sources

External links 

 
 

1647 births
1710 deaths
People educated at Westminster School, London
Alumni of Christ Church, Oxford
English Christian theologians
English composers
English logicians
17th-century English architects
Fellows of Christ Church, Oxford
Deans of Christ Church, Oxford
Vice-Chancellors of the University of Oxford
Burials at Christ Church Cathedral, Oxford
English philosophers
English male poets